Offshore Energies UK (OEUK), formerly known as Oil and Gas UK (OGUK), is a trade association for the United Kingdom offshore energies industry. The current Chief Executive is Deirdre Michie O.B.E.

History
OEUK is a not-for-profit organisation, established in April 2007 on the foundations of the UK Offshore Operators Association (UKOOA). The association is the leading representative body for the UK offshore energies that stretches back over 30 years. Its membership is open to all companies active in the area; these include businesses such as super majors, independent oil companies, wind and hydrogen, and SMEs working in the supply chain.

Function
OEUK is a trade association for the whole sector. It is a source of information for and about the UK Upstream and a gateway to industry networks and expertise.

They do this by:
raising the profile of the UK offshore energies sector.
promoting open dialogue within and across all sectors of the industry on issues including technical, fiscal, safety, environmental and skills issues, and brokering solutions.
developing and delivering industry-wide initiatives engaging with governments and other external organisations with a stake in the industry’s future.

Location
The association is situated near St Paul's Cathedral on the 1st Floor of Paternoster House in the City of Westminster. It also has an office on 4th Floor, Annan House, 33-35 Palmerston Road, Aberdeen, AB11 5QP, in the town where the UKOOA was based.

Subsidiaries
OEUK has one subsidiary:

Leading Oil and Gas Industry Competitiveness

See also
Petroleum industry in Aberdeen
Oil and gas industry in the United Kingdom
North Sea oil
List of oil and gas fields of the North Sea

References

Trade associations based in the United Kingdom
Non-profit organisations based in the United Kingdom
Organisations based in Aberdeen
Organisations based in the City of Westminster
Petroleum industry in the United Kingdom
Petroleum organizations
Organizations established in 2007
2007 establishments in the United Kingdom